Lambidou is a rural commune and village in the Cercle of Diéma in the Kayes Region of western Mali. As well as the main village (chef-lieu) of Lambidou, the commune includes the villages of Singoné, Koumarenga and Kary. In the 2009 census the commune had a population of 14,947.

References

Communes of Kayes Region